Chants and Dances of the Native Americans, also referred to as Sacred Spirit, is the debut studio album by German musical project Sacred Spirit, released in 1994.

Track listing 
 "How the West Was Lost (Intro and Prelude)" – 2:59
 "Winter Ceremony (Tor-Cheney-Nahana)" – 6:56
 "The Counterclockwise Circle Dance (Ly-O-Lay Ale Loya)" – 5:10
 "Celebrate Wild Rice (Ya-Na-Hana)" – 7:05
 "The Cradlesong (Dawa)" – 4:17
 "Advice for the Young (Gitchi-Manidoo)" – 6:02
 "Wishes of Happiness & Prosperity (Yeha-Noha)" – 4:03
 "Elevation (Ta-Was-Ne)" – 2:39
 "Intertribal Song to Stop the Rain (Heya-Hee)" – 7:45
 "Heal the Soul (Shamanic Chant No.5)" – 1:20
 "Brandishing the Tomahawk (Yo-Hey-O-Hee)" – 6:15

Charts

Certifications and sales

References 

1994 albums